Purdown BT Tower, also known as Purdown Transmitter (sometimes written as Pur Down), is a 70.1 metres (230 ft) tall telecommunications tower in Bristol, England. Built in 1970 for the British Telecom microwave network, it is now used to transmit radio and provide mobile phone coverage.

It is a prominent landmark visible from many areas of the city, and from major transport routes on the approach to the city, including the M32 motorway and Filton Bank railway. The tower is recorded as a Valued Landmark by Bristol City Council, and it has been featured in locally-produced media, such as the opening sequence of TV series Skins (2008).

It is one of fourteen reinforced concrete towers owned by BT in the UK.

History 
A temporary steel-lattice tower was built on the site in 1961, ready for the commencement of the GPO (later to become BT) microwave network, which used a network of point-to-point microwave links. The reinforced concrete tower was built in 1969-71, using a design modified from the GPO's "Chilterns type", pioneered at the Stokenchurch BT Tower.

Much of the BT microwave network became redundant after the rollout of fibreoptic infrastructure, and, like many other BT towers in the 2000s, the redundant dishes were removed from Purdown in 2008.

Current uses
As of 2022, the tower remains in the ownership of BT, with space leased to various companies for broadcast and mobile communications infrastructure.

Arqiva use the tower to broadcast BBC and commercial radio on FM and DAB to the city.

Analogue radio (VHF FM)

Digital radio (DAB)

In popular culture
The tower played a prominent part in the series finale of BBC Three's 2016 drama series Thirteen, starring Jodie Comer.

See also
Telecommunications towers in the United Kingdom
List of towers

References

External links

Purdown Transmitter pictures on Flickr

Communication towers in the United Kingdom
Towers in Bristol
British Telecom buildings and structures
Buildings and structures in Bristol
Transmitter sites in England